Cephissus (Kifisos) is a river in the vicinity of Athens, Greece.

The Bibliotheca (3.15.1) states that the legendary Erechtheus' wife Praxithea was daughter of Phrasimus (otherwise unknown to us) by Diogenia (otherwise unknown to us) daughter of Cephissus.

The source of the river is in the saddle depression between the Parnitha and Penteli mountains. From there it flows generally southwest until it reaches the Phaleron Bay between Neo Faliro and Moschato.  Presently the river flows near or under the Motorway 1 linking Athens and Thessaloniki for much of its length. This section of Motorway 1 is named Avenue Kifissou, near which is the Kifissos Bus Terminal.

References

Rivers of Greece
Rivers of Attica
Landforms of East Attica
Landforms of North Athens (regional unit)
Landforms of South Athens (regional unit)
Drainage basins of the Aegean Sea
Potamoi